Honda is a Japanese public multinational conglomerate manufacturer of automobiles, motorcycles and power equipment.

Honda may also refer to:

Companies

Air Transportation 
 Honda Aircraft Company
 Honda Airport

Engines 
 GE Honda Aero Engines

Motorsports 
 Honda Racing F1
 Honda Racing

Transportation 
 Acura
 American Honda Motor Company
 Honda Performance Development
 Atlas Honda motorcycles (Pakistan)
 Dongfeng Honda (China) 
 Guangqi Honda 
 Everus (Li Nian)
 Honda Automobile (China)

 Honda Atlas Cars (Pakistan)
 Honda Canada Inc.
 Honda Cars India
 Honda Motorcycle and Scooter India
 Honda Taiwan
 Honda UK Manufacturing
 Montesa Honda (Spain)

Other 
 Mobilityland

Places 
 Honda Bay, in Puerto Princesa, Philippines
 Honda Center, an arena in Anaheim, California, United States
 Honda, Tolima, a municipality in Colombia
 Bahia Honda Key, an island in the Florida Keys, United States
 Bahía Honda, Cuba, a municipality in Cuba

Geology 
 Honda Group, fossiliferous geological group in Colombia, named after Honda, Tolima

People 
 Honda (surname)

Other uses 
 Honda knot, often used to tie a lasso
 "Honda", a song by FKA Twigs featuring Pa Salieu from Caprisongs
 "Honda", a song by Friday Night Plans

See also